The 2019 European Junior Swimming Championships (50 m) were held from 3 to 7 July 2019 in Kazan, Russia at the Palace of Water Sports. The Championships were organized by LEN, the European Swimming League, and were held in a 50-meter pool. The Championships were for girls aged 14–17 and boys age 15–18.

Results

Boys

Girls

Mixed events

Medal table

References

External links 
Results
Results book

European Junior Swimming Championships
European Junior Swimming Championships
International aquatics competitions hosted by Russia
European Junior Swimming Championships
Sport in Kazan
21st century in Kazan
Junior Swimming Championships
European Junior Swimming Championships